Films generate income from several revenue streams, including theatrical exhibition, home video, television broadcast rights, and merchandising. However, theatrical box-office earnings are the primary metric for trade publications in assessing the success of a film, mostly because of the availability of the data compared to sales figures for home video and broadcast rights, but also because of historical practice. Included on the list are charts of the top box-office earners (ranked by both the nominal and real value of their revenue), a chart of high-grossing films by calendar year, a timeline showing the transition of the highest-grossing film record, and a chart of the highest-grossing film franchises and series. All charts are ranked by international theatrical box-office performance where possible, excluding income derived from home video, broadcasting rights, and merchandise.

Traditionally, war films, musicals, and historical dramas have been the most popular genres, but franchise films have been among the best performers of the 21st century. There is strong interest in the superhero genre, with ten films in the Marvel Cinematic Universe featuring among the nominal top-earners. The most successful superhero film, Avengers: Endgame, is also the second-highest-grossing film on the nominal earnings chart, and there are four films in total based on the Avengers comic books charting in the top twenty. Other Marvel Comics adaptations have also had success with the Spider-Man and X-Men properties, while films based on Batman and Superman from DC Comics have generally performed well. Star Wars is also represented in the nominal earnings chart with five films, while the Harry Potter, Jurassic Park and Pirates of the Caribbean franchises feature prominently. Although the nominal earnings chart is dominated by films adapted from pre-existing properties and sequels, it is headed by Avatar, which is an original work. Animated family films have performed consistently well, with Disney films enjoying lucrative re-releases prior to the home-video era. Disney also enjoyed later success with films such as Frozen and Frozen II, Zootopia, and The Lion King (with its computer-animated remake as the highest-grossing animated film), as well as its Pixar brand, of which Incredibles 2, Toy Story 3 and 4, and Finding Dory have been the best performers. Beyond Disney and Pixar animation, the Despicable Me, Shrek, and Ice Age series have met with the most success.

While inflation has eroded the achievements of most films from the 1950s, 1960s, and 1970s, there are franchises originating from that period that are still active. Besides the Star Wars and Superman franchises, James Bond and Godzilla films are still being released periodically; all four are among the highest-grossing franchises. Some of the older films that held the record of highest-grossing film still have respectable grosses by today's standards, but no longer compete numerically against today's top-earners in an era of much higher individual ticket prices. When those prices are adjusted for inflation, however, then Gone with the Wind—which was the highest-grossing film outright for twenty-five years—is still the highest-grossing film of all time. All grosses on the list are expressed in U.S. dollars at their nominal value, except where stated otherwise.

Highest-grossing films 

With a worldwide box-office gross of over $2.9 billion, Avatar is proclaimed to be the "highest-grossing" film, but such claims usually refer to theatrical revenues only and do not take into account home video and television income, which can form a significant portion of a film's earnings. Once revenue from home entertainment is factored in it is not immediately clear which film is the most successful. Titanic earned $1.2 billion from video and DVD sales and rentals, in addition to the $2.2 billion it grossed in theatres. While complete sales data are not available for Avatar, it earned $345 million from the sale of sixteen million DVD and Blu-ray units in North America, and ultimately sold a total of thirty million DVD and Blu-ray units worldwide. After home video income is accounted for, both films have earned over $3 billion each. Television broadcast rights will also substantially add to a film's earnings, with a film often earning as much as 20–25% of its theatrical box office for a couple of television runs on top of pay-per-view revenues; Titanic earned a further $55 million from the NBC and HBO broadcast rights, equating to about 9% of its North American gross.

When a film is highly exploitable as a commercial property, its ancillary revenues can dwarf its income from direct film sales. The Lion King (1994) earned over $2 billion in box-office and home video sales, but this pales in comparison to the $8 billion earned at box offices around the world by the stage adaptation. Merchandising can be extremely lucrative too: The Lion King also sold $3 billion of merchandise, while Pixar's Cars—which earned $462 million in theatrical revenues and was only a modest hit by comparison to other Pixar films—generated global merchandise sales of over $8 billion in the five years after its 2006 release. Pixar had another huge hit with Toy Story 3, which generated almost $10 billion in merchandise retail sales in addition to the $1 billion it earned at the box office.

On this chart, films are ranked by the revenues from theatrical exhibition at their nominal value, along with the highest positions they attained. Six films in total have grossed in excess of $2 billion worldwide, with Avatar ranked in the top position. All of the films have had a theatrical run (including re-releases) in the 21st century, and films that have not played during this period do not appear on the chart because of ticket-price inflation, population size and ticket purchasing trends not being considered.

Highest-grossing films adjusted for inflation 

Because of the long-term effects of inflation, notably the significant increase of movie theater ticket prices, the list unadjusted for inflation gives far more weight to later films. The unadjusted list, while commonly found in the press, is therefore largely meaningless for comparing films widely separated in time, as many films from earlier eras will never appear on a modern unadjusted list, despite achieving higher commercial success when adjusted for price increases. To compensate for the devaluation of the currency, some charts make adjustments for inflation, but not even this practice fully addresses the issue, since ticket prices and inflation do not necessarily parallel one another. For example, in 1970, tickets cost $1.55 or about $6.68 in inflation-adjusted 2004 dollars; by 1980, prices had risen to about $2.69, a drop to $5.50 in inflation-adjusted 2004 dollars. Ticket prices have also risen at different rates of inflation around the world, further complicating the process of adjusting worldwide grosses.

Another complication is release in multiple formats for which different ticket prices are charged. One notable example of this phenomenon is Avatar, which was also released in 3D and IMAX: almost two-thirds of tickets for that film were for 3D showings with an average price of $10, and about one-sixth were for IMAX showings with an average price over $14.50, compared to a 2010 average price of $7.61 for 2D films. Social and economic factors such as population change and the growth of international markets also have an effect on the number of people purchasing theater tickets, along with audience demographics where some films sell a much higher proportion of discounted children's tickets, or perform better in big cities where tickets cost more.

The measuring system for gauging a film's success is based on unadjusted grosses, mainly because historically this is the way it has always been done because of the practices of the film industry: the box-office receipts are compiled by theaters and relayed to the distributor, which in turn releases them to the media. Converting to a more representative system that counts ticket sales rather than gross is also fraught with problems because the only data available for older films are the sale totals. As the motion picture industry is highly oriented towards marketing currently released films, unadjusted figures are always used in marketing campaigns so that new blockbuster films can much more easily achieve a high sales ranking, and thus be promoted as a "top film of all time", so there is little incentive to switch to a more robust analysis from a marketing or even newsworthy point of view.

Despite the inherent difficulties in accounting for inflation, several attempts have been made. Estimates depend on the price index used to adjust the grosses, and the exchange rates used to convert between currencies can also affect the calculations, both of which can have an effect on the ultimate rankings of an inflation adjusted list. Gone with the Wind—first released in 1939—is generally considered to be the most successful film, with Guinness World Records in 2014 estimating its adjusted global gross at $3.4 billion. Estimates for Gone with the Winds adjusted gross have varied substantially: its owner, Turner Entertainment, estimated its adjusted earnings at $3.3 billion in 2007, a few years earlier than the Guinness estimate; other estimates fall either side of this amount, with one putting its gross just under $3 billion in 2010, while another provided an alternative figure of $3.8 billion in 2006. Which film is Gone with the Winds nearest rival depends on the set of figures used: Guinness had Avatar in second place with $3 billion, while other estimates saw Titanic in the runner-up spot with first-run worldwide earnings of almost $2.9 billion at 2010 prices.

High-grossing films by year 

Audience tastes were fairly eclectic during the 20th century, but several trends did emerge. During the silent era, films with war themes were popular with audiences, with The Birth of a Nation (American Civil War), The Four Horsemen of the Apocalypse, The Big Parade and Wings (all World War I) becoming the most successful films in their respective years of release, with the trend coming to an end with All Quiet on the Western Front in 1930. With the advent of sound in 1927, the musical—the genre best placed to showcase the new technology—took over as the most popular type of film with audiences, with 1928 and 1929 both being topped by musical films. The genre continued to perform strongly in the 1930s, but the outbreak of World War II saw war-themed films dominate again during this period, starting with Gone with the Wind (American Civil War) in 1939, and finishing with The Best Years of Our Lives (World War II) in 1946. Samson and Delilah (1949) saw the beginning of a trend of increasingly expensive historical dramas set during Ancient Rome/biblical times throughout the 1950s as cinema competed with television for audiences, with Quo Vadis, The Robe, The Ten Commandments, Ben-Hur and Spartacus all becoming the highest-grossing film of the year during initial release, before the genre started to wane after several high-profile failures. The success of White Christmas and South Pacific in the 1950s foreshadowed the comeback of the musical in the 1960s with West Side Story, Mary Poppins, My Fair Lady, The Sound of Music and Funny Girl all among the top films of the decade. The 1970s saw a shift in audience tastes to high concept films, with six such films made by either George Lucas or Steven Spielberg topping the chart during the 1980s. The 21st century has seen an increasing dependence on franchises and adaptations, with the box-office dominance of films based on pre-existing intellectual property at record levels.

Steven Spielberg is the most represented director on the chart, with six films to his credit, occupying the top spot in 1975, 1981, 1982, 1984, 1989 and 1993. Cecil B. DeMille (1932, 1947, 1949, 1952 and 1956) is in second place with five films and William Wyler (1942, 1946, 1959 and 1968) and James Cameron (1991, 1997, 2009 and 2022) are tied for third place with four films. D. W. Griffith (1915, 1916 and 1920), George Roy Hill (1966, 1969 and 1973) and the Russo brothers (2016, 2018 and 2019) all feature heavily with three films apiece. George Lucas directed two chart-toppers in 1977 and 1999, but also served in a strong creative capacity as a producer and writer in 1980, 1981, 1983, 1984 and 1989 as well. The following directors have also all directed two films on the chart: Frank Lloyd, King Vidor, Frank Capra, Michael Curtiz, Leo McCarey, Alfred Hitchcock, David Lean, Stanley Kubrick, Guy Hamilton, Mike Nichols, William Friedkin, Peter Jackson, Gore Verbinski, and Michael Bay; Mervyn LeRoy, Ken Annakin and Robert Wise are each represented by one solo credit and one shared credit, and John Ford co-directed two films. Disney films are usually co-directed and some directors have served on several winning teams: Wilfred Jackson, Hamilton Luske, Clyde Geronimi, David Hand, Ben Sharpsteen, Wolfgang Reitherman and Bill Roberts have all co-directed at least two films on the list. Only seven directors have topped the chart in consecutive years: McCarey (1944 and 1945), Nichols (1966 and 1967), Spielberg (1981 and 1982), Jackson (2002 and 2003), Verbinski (2006 and 2007) and the Russo brothers (2018 and 2019).

Because of release schedules—especially in the case of films released towards the end of the year—and different release patterns across the world, many films can do business in two or more calendar years; therefore the grosses documented here are not confined to just the year of release. Grosses are not limited to original theatrical runs either, with many older films often being re-released periodically so the figures represent all the business a film has done since its original release; a film's first-run gross is included in brackets after the total if known. Because of incomplete data it cannot be known for sure how much money some films have made and when they made it, but generally the chart chronicles the films from each year that went on to earn the most. In the cases where estimates conflict both films are recorded, and in cases where a film has moved into first place because of being re-released the previous record-holder is also retained.

(...) Since grosses are not limited to original theatrical runs, a film's first-run gross is included in brackets after the total if known.

Timeline of highest-grossing films 

At least eleven films have held the record of 'highest-grossing film' since The Birth of a Nation assumed the top spot in 1915. Both The Birth of a Nation and Gone with the Wind spent twenty-five consecutive years apiece as the highest-grosser, with films directed by Steven Spielberg and James Cameron holding the record on three occasions each. Spielberg became the first director to break his own record when Jurassic Park overtook E.T., and Cameron emulated the feat when Avatar broke the record set by Titanic. When it took over the top spot in 2019, Avengers: Endgame became the first sequel to hold the record of highest-grossing film, and in doing so interrupted thirty-six years of Spielberg/Cameron dominance before Avatar reclaimed the top spot two years later in 2021 upon a re-release.

Some sources claim that The Big Parade superseded The Birth of a Nation as highest-grossing film, eventually being replaced by Snow White and the Seven Dwarfs, which in turn was quickly usurped by Gone with the Wind. Exact figures are not known for The Birth of a Nation, but contemporary records put its worldwide earnings at $5.2 million as of 1919. Its international release was delayed by World War I, and it was not released in many foreign territories until the 1920s; coupled with further re-releases in the United States, its $10 million earnings as reported by Variety in 1932 are consistent with the earlier figure. At this time, Variety still had The Birth of a Nation ahead of The Big Parade ($6,400,000) on distributor rentals and—if its estimate is correct—Snow White and the Seven Dwarfs ($8,500,000) would not have earned enough on its first theatrical run to take the record; although it would have been the highest-grossing 'talkie', displacing The Singing Fool ($5,900,000). Although received wisdom holds that it is unlikely The Birth of a Nation was ever overtaken by a silent-era film, the record would fall to 1925's Ben-Hur ($9,386,000) if The Birth of a Nation earned significantly less than its estimated gross. In addition to its gross rental earnings through public exhibition, The Birth of a Nation played at a large number of private, club and organizational engagements which figures are unavailable for. It was hugely popular with the Ku Klux Klan who used it to drive recruitment, and at one point Variety estimated its total earnings to stand at around $50 million. Despite later retracting the claim, the sum has been widely reported even though it has never been substantiated. While it is generally accepted that Gone with the Wind took over the record of highest-grossing film on its initial release—which is true in terms of public exhibition—it is likely it did not overtake The Birth of a Nation in total revenue until a much later date, with it still being reported as the highest earner up until the 1960s. Gone with the Wind itself may have been briefly overtaken by The Ten Commandments (1956), which closed at the end of 1960 with worldwide rentals of $58–60 million compared to Gone with the Winds $59 million; if it did claim the top spot its tenure there was short-lived, since Gone with the Wind was re-released the following year and increased its earnings to $67 million. Depending on how accurate the estimates are, the 1959 remake of Ben-Hur may also have captured the record from Gone with the Wind: as of the end of 1961 it had earned $47 million worldwide, and by 1963 it was trailing Gone with the Wind by just $2 million with international takings of $65 million, ultimately earning $66 million from its initial release.

Another film purported to have been the highest-grosser is the 1972 pornographic film Deep Throat. In 1984, Linda Lovelace testified to a United States Senate Judiciary Subcommittee on juvenile justice that the film had earned $600 million; this figure has been the subject of much speculation, since if it is accurate then the film would have made more money than Star Wars, and finished the 1970s as the highest-grossing film. The main argument against this figure is that it simply did not have a wide enough release to sustain the sort of sums that would be required for it to ultimately gross this amount. Exact figures are not known, but testimony in a federal trial in 1976—about four years into the film's release—showed the film had grossed over $25 million. Roger Ebert has reasoned it possibly did earn as much as $600 million on paper, since mobsters owned most of the adult movie theaters during this period and would launder income from drugs and prostitution through them, so probably inflated the box-office receipts for the film.

The Birth of a Nation, Gone with the Wind, The Godfather, Jaws, Star Wars, E.T., and Avatar all increased their record grosses with re-releases. The grosses from their original theatrical runs are included here along with totals from re-releases up to the point that they lost the record; therefore the total for The Birth of a Nation includes income from its reissues up to 1940; the total for Star Wars includes revenue from the late 1970s and early 1980s reissues but not from the 1997 Special Edition; the total for E.T. incorporates its gross from the 1985 reissue but not from 2002. The total for Avatar's first appearance on the chart includes revenue from the 2010 Special Edition, which represents all of its earnings up to the point it relinquished the record, whereas its second appearance also incorporates revenue from a 2020 re-release in the Asia-Pacific region as well as the 2021 re-release in China which helped it to reclaim the record. Gone with the Wind is likewise represented twice on the chart: the 1940 entry includes earnings from its staggered 1939–1942 release (roadshow/general release/second-run) along with all of its revenue up to the 1961 reissue prior to losing the record to The Sound of Music in 1966; its 1971 entry—after it took back the record—includes income from the 1967 and 1971 reissues but omitting later releases. The Godfather was re-released in 1973 after its success at the 45th Academy Awards, and Jaws was released again in 1976, and their grosses here most likely include earnings from those releases. The Sound of Music, The Godfather, Jaws, Jurassic Park, and Titanic increased their earnings with further releases in 1973, 1997, 1979, 2013, and 2012, respectively, but they are not included in the totals here because they had already conceded the record prior to being re-released.

Highest-grossing franchises and film series 

Prior to 2000, only seven film series had grossed over $1 billion at the box office: James Bond, Star Wars, Indiana Jones, Rocky, Batman, Jurassic Park, and Star Trek. Since the turn of the century, that number has increased to over eighty (not including one-off hits such as Titanic and Zootopia). This is partly due to inflation and market growth, but it is also due to Hollywood's adoption of the franchise model: films that have built-in brand recognition such as being based on a well-known literary source or an established character. The methodology is based on the concept that films associated with things audiences are already familiar with can be more effectively marketed to them, and as such are known as "pre-sold" films within the industry.

A franchise is typically defined to be at least two works derived from a common intellectual property. Traditionally, the work has a tautological relationship with the property, but this is not a prerequisite. An enduring staple of the franchise model is the concept of the crossover, which can be defined as "a story in which characters or concepts from two or more discrete texts or series of texts meet". A consequence of a crossover is that an intellectual property may be utilized by more than one franchise. For example, Batman v Superman: Dawn of Justice belongs to not only the Batman and Superman franchises, but also to the DC Extended Universe, which is a shared universe. A shared universe is a particular type of crossover where a number of characters from a wide range of fictional works wind up sharing a fictional world. The most successful shared universe in the medium of film is the Marvel Cinematic Universe, a crossover between multiple superhero properties owned by Marvel Comics. The Marvel Cinematic Universe is also the highest-grossing franchise, amassing over $28 billion at the box office.

The Star Wars films are the highest-grossing series based on a single property, earning over $10 billion at the box office (although the Eon James Bond films have earned over $19 billion in total when adjusted to current prices). If ancillary income from merchandise is included, then Star Wars is the most lucrative property; it holds the Guinness world record for the "most successful film merchandising franchise" and was valued at £19.51 billion in 2012 (approximately $30 billion). The Marvel Cinematic Universe has had the most films gross over $1 billion, with ten. The four Avengers films, the two Frozen films, and the two Avatar films are the only franchises where each installment has grossed over $1 billion, although the Jurassic Park and Black Panther series have averaged over $1 billion per film.

See also 

 Lists of highest-grossing films

Notes

References

Box office sources

Franchise and series sources 

 
 Avengers
 
 Batman
 
 Fathom events
 Batman (UK): 
 Batman Returns (UK): 
 Batman Forever: 
 Batman and Robin: 
 Batman: The Movie (1966)  
 
 
 
 
 DC Extended Universe
 
 Despicable Me
 
 The Fast and the Furious
 
 
 The Hunger Games
 
 Ice Age
 
 
 J.K. Rowling's Wizarding World
 
 James Bond
  (Brosnan and Craig)
 . "James Bond Franchise Films: All-Release Worldwide Box Office." (Connery, Lazenby, Moore and Dalton)
 
 
 
 Jurassic Park
 
 
 The Lion King
 
 Marvel Cinematic Universe
 
 Middle-earth
 
 
 
 
 
 Mission: Impossible
 
 Pirates of the Caribbean
 
 Shrek
 
 Spider-Man
 
 
 Star Wars
 
 
 
 
 
 
 
 Disney releases (2015–present): 
 Toy Story
 
 Transformers
 
 The Twilight Saga
 
 
 X-Men

Bibliography

External links 
 All-Time Worldwide Box Office Grosses at Box Office Mojo
 All-Time Highest-Grossing Movies Worldwide at The Numbers
 Box-Office Top 100 Films of All Time at Filmsite.org

 
Record progressions